The Baja 1000 is an annual Mexican off-road motorsport race held on the Baja California Peninsula. It is one of the most prestigious off-road races in the world, having attracted competitors from six continents. The race was founded by Ed Pearlman in 1967 and is sanctioned by SCORE International. The race is the final round of a four-race annual series, which also includes the San Felipe 250, the Baja 400 and the Baja 500. The 2017 Baja 1000 marked the 50th anniversary of the race.

The Baja 1000 has various types of classes include Trophy trucks, Dirtbikes, Truggys, Side-by-sides, Baja Bugs and Buggies all competing at the same time on the same course. The course has remained relatively the same over the years, about every other event being either a point-to-point race from Ensenada to La Paz, or a loop race starting and finishing in Ensenada. The name of the event can be misleading as the mileage varies for the type of event. A "Loop" can be 600 to 850 miles starting and finishing in Ensenada, or "Point to Point" also known as the 900.

Race history

1962: The first timed run
When Jack McCormack and Walt Fulton of Honda's American subsidiary decided to hold a long-distance run to prove the reliability of the new Honda CL72 Scrambler motorcycle, they approached well-known off-road motorcycle racer and local Triumph and Honda dealer, Bud Ekins for suggestions. Ekins declined to undertake the run because of his professional association to Triumph, but suggested that his brother Dave Ekins and the son of another Southern California Honda distributor, Billy Robertson Jr. could accomplish the trip for American Honda. 

After performing an aerial pre-run over the peninsula in Fulton's Cessna 180, Ekins and Robertson began the journey to La Paz just after midnight on March 22, 1962. The event received coverage in the Globe, Argosy, and Cycle World magazines, earning awe and respect for Honda and the Baja run. The Globe and Argosy accounts also included close encounters with death and other dangers which Ekins claims were "colorful additions".

Four wheels vs two wheels
Wanting to beat the existing motorcycle record and to help fuel sales of the Meyers Manx, Bruce Meyers used his original prototype buggy called "Old Red" for an attempt at breaking the record set by Ekins. After pre-running a course south to La Paz, Ted Mangels and Bruce Meyers started the record-breaking attempt back to Tijuana from La Paz at 10:00 pm on April 19, 1967. With a journalist from Road & Track magazine following the two to witness the attempt, the final official time was 34:45, beating Ekins' run by more than five hours. Upon returning to the United States, the journalist documenting the run sent out press kits with photographs and a news release with the headline "Buggy Beats Bike in Baja." to hundreds of magazines and newspapers. Soon, more stories of adventure, close calls, and broken speed records received media coverage around the world. Following the event, Bruce Meyers and his Meyers Manx became an overnight sensation and the competition between four wheels and motorcycles for the fastest Baja run began.

In the following months, more attempts at breaking the record would take place. One of the attempts included a multiple vehicle run organized by Ed Pearlman that ended in an official four wheel record being recorded but, with the overall time falling short of the record set by Meyers. On July 4, 1967, an American Motors Rambler American sedan would leave Tijuana at 9:00 am to successfully break the record set by Meyers with an overall time of 31 hours.

1967: The Mexican 1000
As the timed runs recorded via telegraph became popular, a need for an organized event to compete for the quickest Baja run was starting to grab the attention of other competitors. In response to Meyers' record setting run, Ed Pearlman convinced Dick Cepek, Claude Dozier, Ed Orr, Drino Miller and journalist John Lawlor to make the run to La Paz. In June 1967, Pearlman and group left Tijuana and immediately ran into mechanical troubles. This trip inspired Pearlman to organize an off-road race down the Baja peninsula by creating the National Off-Road Racing Association (NORRA). After Pete Condos and Pearlman put up the funds to incorporate NORRA, the group announced an official recognition of the previous record setters and created classes that related to the type of vehicle used to break the record. During the later part of summer, NORRA named the event the "Mexican 1000 Rally" and announced the first official race from Tijuana to La Paz was to be held on the peninsula.

The first official race started in Tijuana, Baja California, on October 31, 1967, and was named the NORRA Mexican 1000 Rally. From 1967 to 1972, the race was organized by NORRA and grew in popularity with ABC's "Wide World of Sports" sending Jim McKay to cover the 1968 event, and attracting new participants like the late Mickey Thompson, Indy 500 winner Parnelli Jones, movie actor James Garner, and Mary McGee, the first woman to compete in the event. By 1971, major sponsors such as Olympia Brewing Company and Minolta Cameras began to support Parnelli Jones in his Dick Russell designed and Bill Stroppe prepared "Big Oly" Bronco and Larry Minor in a similar Stroppe prepared Bronco.

1973 oil crisis and SCORE
In October 1973, the price for a barrel of crude oil shot up 70% overnight as the Organization of Petroleum Exporting Countries (OPEC) launched the Arab Oil Embargo. With fear that competitors would abandon the idea of competing and stay home, NORRA cancelled the 1974 Baja race – despite assurances from the Federal government run Petroleos Mexicanos (Pemex) that fuel prices would remain stable – and announced they would instead hold an event in the state of Arizona.

It was at that time in history, Baja California governor Milton Castellanos handed over sanctioning of the event to a non-profit Mexican corporation called the "Baja Sports Committee" (BSC). BSC renamed the event the "Baja Mil" (Baja 1000) and scheduled the race to run on the original dates chosen by NORRA. Though NORRA held a competing event in the United States that same weekend, BSC successfully ran the race from Ensenada to La Paz like the years prior. Unaware of the challenges, BSC found promoting Baja races more difficult than anticipated.

Instead of giving up the race, the Mexican government requested help from SCORE International in hosting and promoting future Baja races. Through negotiations with Mickey Thompson and his SCORE organization, the Government agreed to give exclusive rights to SCORE to hold Baja races and also reluctantly allowed SCORE to cancel the event for 1974 (a year where motorsport was curtailed in the United States because of the oil crisis). SCORE hired Sal Fish as president and took control of the Baja 1000 from that year on with the Baja 1000 race resuming under new control in 1975.

The 1979 race was notable for Walker Evans’ overall win in a Dodge truck, the first truck to win the overall title of the race. In 2012, the racing organization was purchased by Roger Norman and continues to run under his presidency.

Vehicles
The Baja 1000 is open to entrants competing in several classes ranging from dirt bikes, ATVs, side-by-sides, buggies, truggy and custom fabricated race vehicles. Race teams consist of factory-supported groups that build custom fabricated vehicles and provide chase vehicles via helicopter, to the much smaller and less glamorized sportsman teams competing in an all-stock vehicle with no chase vehicle support at all. Stock Volkswagen Type One Beetles are modified for use in off-road terrain, known as Baja Bugs, have been a common sight throughout the event duration, but the factory-supported, all-spaceframe Trophy Truck entries are the most visible.

In contrast to the current factory EX supported modern race vehicles that tend to dominate the car and truck classes, Erik Carlsson drove a basically stock front wheel drive Saab 96 V4, finishing third in 1969 and fifth in 1970.

Baja course

Point-to-point: A point-to-point race is one that starts and ends in two different locations. The start is traditionally held in Ensenada but has been held in Tijuana and Mexicali as well.
Loop race: A loop race is one that starts and finishes in the same location. Traditionally the race starts and ends in Ensenada but has started/finished in Mexicali as well. The course length varies from 600 to 850 miles, depending on the course route.

Qualifying 
The starting order is generally determined by a random draw, except when preferential starts are given to those who finished in top positions in the previous race/season, or when qualifying is held. For Trophy Trucks & Class 1 vehicles, qualifying for the Baja 1000 is now held during SEMA at the Las Vegas Motor Speedway.

Sabotage and booby-traps
Each year there are reports of spectators sabotaging or booby-trapping the course by digging holes, blocking a river to create a makeshift watersplash, or burying and hiding obstacles. Racers are warned to beware of large crowds of spectators in remote parts of the course since it may indicate hidden traps or obstacle changes. Many of the booby traps are not created to intentionally injure the contestants but are created by the local spectators as jumps or obstacles for their own entertainment and to create intriguing moments to be caught on videotape. The haphazardly designed obstacles, created by the spectators, are often very dangerous as the contestants may inadvertently enter the booby-trap at unsafe speeds, resulting in damage to the vehicles or injuries to competitors or spectators.  Awareness of booby traps and course alterations are often part of race-day strategy and convey an advantage to the best prepared teams – nonetheless given the danger the traps pose, it is customary for competitors to quickly communicate course hazards to other competitors through on-board radio communications and radio relay.

In popular culture
 In the film Timerider (1982), the hero Swann is competing in the Baja 1000 when he inadvertently stumbles on to a time warp experiment and is sent back to the Old West in the 1870s.
 The documentary Dust to Glory (2005) follows contestants of the Baja 1000.
 The follow-up documentary to Dust to Glory, Dust 2 Glory, follows contestants over the 2016 season before being released in-time for the 50th anniversary Baja 1000 in 2016.
 Baja: Edge of Control is a 2008 video game about the Baja 1000 developed by 2XL Games and published by THQ for PlayStation 3 and Xbox 360.
 SCORE International Baja 1000, known in Europe as SCORE International Baja 1000: World Championship Off Road Racing, is a video game  developed by Left Field Productions and published by Activision in 2008. It was released for PlayStation 2, PlayStation 3, Microsoft Windows, Nintendo Wii, and Xbox 360. The game received poor reviews for all versions.

Overall winners

**Officially the race was called the Baja 2000 (1726 miles) for the year 2000.

Notable competitors

 Alan Ampudia
 BJ Baldwin
 Ron Bishop
 Ken Block 
 Pete Brock
 Jenson Button
 Johnny Campbell
 Erik Carlsson
 Kurt Caselli
 Anna Jo Cody
 Quinn Cody
 Marc Coma
 Justin Davis
 Chuck Dempsey
 Patrick Dempsey
 Walker Evans
 Andrew "Freddie" Flintoff
 Elliot Forbes-Robinson
 Tanner Foust
 James Garner
 Brendan Gaughan
 Bob Gordon
 Beccy Gordon
 Robby Gordon
 Mike Groff
 Robbie Groff
 Roberto Guerrero
 Rod Hall
 Chris Harris
 Steve Hengeveld
 Riley Herbst
 Troy Herbst
 Larry Janesky
 Tanner Janesky
 Jimmie Johnson
 Ricky Johnson
 Austin Jones
 Parnelli Jones
 P. J. Jones
 Michel Jourdain Jr.
 Michel Jourdain Sr.
 David Kamo
 Danny LaPorte
 Justin Lofton
 Apdaly Lopez
 Rob MacCachren
 Kristen Matlock
 Hiro Matsushita
 Mike "Mouse" McCoy
 Mary McGee
 Hershel McGriff
 Andy McMillin
 Corky McMillin
 Luke McMillin
 Mark McMillin
 Steve McQueen
 Chad McQueen
 Rick Mears
 Roger Mears
 Bryce Menzies
 Rhys Millen
 Rod Millen
 John Morton
 Michael Nesmith
 Paul Newman
 Gunnar Nilsson
 Kendall Norman
 Bruce Ogilvie
 Danny Ongais
 Cody Parkhouse
 Travis Pastrana
 Robbie Pierce
 Christopher Polvoorde
 Toby Price
 Jeff Proctor
 Don Prudhomme
 Larry Ragland
 J.N. Roberts
 Larry Roeseler
 Alexander Rossi
 Armin Schwarz
 Jim Smith
 Malcolm Smith
 Eric Solorzano 
 Cameron Steele
 Ivan Stewart
 Danny Sullivan
 Mickey Thompson
 Jūgatsu Toi
 Johnny Unser
 Jimmy Vasser
 Frank "Scoop" Vessels
 Gus Vildósola
 Tavo Vildósola
 Paul Weel

Current and past classes

Four-Wheelers
SCORE Trophy Truck: Open Production Unlimited Trucks.
SCORE Trophy Truck Spec: Open Production stock engine Trucks.
SCORE Class 1: Unlimited open-wheel single-or two-seaters.
SCORE Class 1/2-1600: open-wheel single-or two-seaters to 1600cc.
SCORE Class 2: Unlimited 2.2-liter buggy.
SCORE Class 3: Short wheelbase 4x4.
SCORE Class 4: Unlimited 2.2-liter open wheel. 
SCORE Class 5: Unlimited Baja Bugs.
SCORE Class 5-1600: 1600cc Baja Bugs.
SCORE Class 6: V6 powered tube chassis trucks
SCORE Class 7: Open mini trucks.
SCORE Class 7S: Stock mini trucks. (3000cc)
SCORE Class 7SX: Modified mini trucks. (4000cc)
SCORE Class 8: Full-sized two-wheel drive trucks.
SCORE Class 9: Short wheelbase, open-wheel single- or two-seaters.
SCORE Class 10: Open-wheel single or two-seaters to 2000cc.
SCORE Class 11: Stock VW Sedans.
SCORE Lites Class 12: VW limited open-wheel single-(1776cc) or two-seaters(1835cc).
SCORE Class 17: Jeepspeed
SCORE Stock Full: Stock full-sized trucks.
SCORE Stock Mini: Stock mini trucks. (4300cc)
SCORE Class M-Truck: Utility vehicle
SCORE Baja Challenge:  Limited, identical open-wheel Baja touring cars.
SCORE Sportsman Buggy:
SCORE Sportsman Truck:
SCORE Sportsman UTV:
ProTruck: Limited Production Trucks governed by the Baja ProTruck Off-Road Race Series

Motorcycles
SCORE Class 20: 125cc or smaller two-stroke and 250cc or smaller four-stroke motorcycles.
SCORE Class 21: 126cc to 250cc.
SCORE Class 22: 250cc or more.
SCORE Class 30: Riders over 30 years old.
SCORE Class 40: Riders over 40 years old.
SCORE Class 50: Riders over 50 years old.
SCORE Class 60: Riders over 65 years old.
SCORE Sportsman MC > 250cc: Sportsman riders 250cc (2-stroke) or 450cc (4-stroke) or greater. 
SCORE Sportsman MC < 250cc: Sportsman riders 250cc (2-stroke) or 450cc (4-stroke) or less.

ATVs
SCORE Class 21: Honda.
SCORE Class 25: 251cc or more.

See also
 Baja 500
 Baja 400
 Dust to Glory, the documentary about the 2003 race
 Mini-Baja
 Timerider

References
Fiolka, Marty (2005). 1000 Miles to Glory. Arizona: David Bull Publishing. .

SCORE International (2006). "2006–2010 Off-Road Racing Rules and Regulations".
SCORE International. "2009 New Classes & Existing Class Rule Amendments
2009 Baja 1000 Press Release

Notes

External links
 Official SCORE International website
 Official SCORE International Journal
 Official SCORE International Carbon TV channel
 1967 Baja 1000 ( Twenty Seven Hours To La Paz – Video )
 General description of 4-wheeled off-road classes.

1967 establishments in Mexico
Auto races in Mexico
Motorcycle races
Off-road racing
Rally raid races
Recurring sporting events established in 1967
Sport in Baja California Sur
Sports competitions in Baja California